The 2009 Poznań Porsche Open was a professional tennis tournament played on clay courts. It was the sixth edition of the tournament which was part of the 2009 ATP Challenger Tour and Tretorn SERIE+. It took place at the Park Tenisowy Olimpia in Poznań, Poland from 18 to 26 July 2009, including the qualifying competition in the first two days.

Singles main draw entrants

Seeds

Other entrants
The following players received wildcards into the singles main draw:
  Gastón Gaudio
  Marcin Gawron
  Jerzy Janowicz
  Andriej Kapaś

The following players received entry from the qualifying draw:
  Adam Chadaj
  Oleksandr Dolgopolov Jr.
  Martin Kližan
  Michał Przysiężny

The following player received entry as a lucky losers:
  Ignacio Coll-Riudavets 
  Andoni Vivanco-Guzmán

Withdrawals
Before the tournament
  Nicolas Devilder
  Andreas Haider-Maurer
  Luis Horna

Doubles main draw entrants

Seeds

Other entrants
The following pairs received wildcards into the doubles main draw:
  Tomasz Bednarek /  Michał Przysiężny
  Marcin Gawron /  Andriej Kapaś
  Kacper Owsian /  Jakub Piter

Champions

Singles

 Peter Luczak def.  Yuri Schukin, 3–6, 7–6(4), 7–6(6)

Doubles

 Sergio Roitman /  Alexandre Sidorenko def.  Michael Kohlmann /  Rogier Wassen, 6–4, 6–4

References

External links
 Official Site

Poznań Porsche Open
Poznań Open
Poz